Six Number Two is a stainless steel sculpture by Kenneth Snelson.

It is located at the Annmarie Sculpture Garden, Solomons, Maryland, on loan from the Hirshhorn Museum and Sculpture Garden.

References

Outdoor sculptures in Maryland
Modernist sculpture
Collection of the Smithsonian Institution
1967 sculptures
Steel sculptures in Maryland
1967 establishments in Maryland
Stainless steel sculptures in the United States